Gustavo Adolfo Chacín (born December 4, 1980) is a Venezuelan former professional baseball pitcher.

Career

Toronto Blue Jays
In 2004, Chacín led all minor leaguers with 18 wins, and was the 24th pitcher used by the Blue Jays, tying the team record set in the 2002 season. Chacín was the first left-handed starter to win his major league debut against the New York Yankees in the Joe Torre era (1996–2007).

Chacín began with the "AA" Eastern League New Hampshire Fisher Cats. He was 16–2 with 109 strikeouts and a 2.86 ERA in  innings, having earned his promotion to the "AAA" International League Syracuse Chiefs after a 34-innings scoreless streak. With the Chiefs, Chacín posted a 2–0 record with 14 strikeouts and a 2.31 ERA in  innings. Then, he was promoted to the Blue Jays and made his debut on September 20, 2004, at Yankee Stadium. Chacín allowed two earned runs on three hits over seven innings for the win, as Toronto beat the Yankees 6–3. In his second start, Chacín held the Baltimore Orioles to four hits and a run in seven innings, but took the loss. At the end of the season, he had compiled a 1–1 record with six strikeouts and a 2.57 ERA in 14 innings

At spring training in 2005, Chacín landed a spot in the Jays' starting rotation. He jumped out to a hot start in the American League, earning a record of 4–1 with 18 strikeouts and a 2.41 ERA over 32.2 innings through the month of April, and was selected the American League Rookie of the Month. In July, Chacín  won five of his six starts, being named Rookie of the Month for the second time in the season. Chacín pitched and won the final game of the season for the Blue Jays against the Kansas City Royals with a solid pitching line of 7.2 innings, 7 hits allowed, 1 run, 1 walk, 3 strikeouts in the 7–2 Blue Jay win. Chacín finished the season with a record of 13–9 and 3.72 ERA in 34 starts. He collected 121 strikeouts in 203 innings. He finished fifth in Rookie of the Year voting, netting two first place votes and fourteen total points, and was named to the Topps All-Star Rookie Team along with fellow Blue Jay Russ Adams.

Chacín finished his 2006 season 9–4 with a 5.05 ERA. He opened the 2007 season with Toronto, but was sent down to the minors by the end of April.

In 2008, Chacín spent the entire season with Toronto's Single-A affiliate Dunedin Blue Jays. He finished the 2008 campaign at Dunedin with a 1-7 won-loss record, and a 7.88 ERA, and was granted free agency by the Blue Jays at the conclusion of the season.

Washington Nationals & Philadelphia Phillies

Chacin signed a minor league contract with the Washington Nationals on December 23, 2008, but was released by that club at the conclusion of spring training.  Only a few days later, Chacin signed a minor league contract with the Philadelphia Phillies.  He split the 2009 season between the Lehigh Valley IronPigs, the Phillies' Triple-A affiliate, and their double-A affiliate in Reading, Pennsylvania, compiling a 9–5 record overall.

Houston Astros
Chacin was signed to a minor league contract by the Houston Astros on December 14, 2009. He also received an invitation to spring training.

On May 3, 2010, the Astros purchased the contract of Chacin from their Class AAA affiliate Round Rock Express of the Pacific Coast League.  Previously, Chacin had been exclusively a starter in the majors; with Houston, he was used exclusively as a relief pitcher.

Chacín had his first major league hit in a game against the Washington Nationals on the May 31, 2010, a solo home run off Nationals starter Luis Atilano. It was his first major league plate appearance in almost five years.

Chacin made 44 appearances for the Astros in 2010, all in relief.  He went 2-2, with one save, and an ERA of 4.70.  He did not make the 2011 club, however, and was sent down to the Triple-A Oklahoma City RedHawks.  After going 3–6 with a 5.13 ERA, he was released by the Astros organization on July 14, 2011.

New York Mets
He signed a minor league contract with the New York Mets on July 16, 2011. The Mets assigned him to the Triple-A Buffalo Bisons. He went 0–1 with the Bisons, compiling a 12.00 ERA in 15 innings of work, and was granted free agency after the season ended.

Personal life
Chacín cannot grow hair because of alopecia areata.

Gustavo Chacín and MLB pitcher Jhoulys Chacín are second cousins (once removed).

A joke on Toronto sports radio station Fan 590 that the name Chacín sounds like it should be the name of a cologne led the Blue Jays to do a "Chacín Cologne Night" on June 27, 2006. 

Chacín was arrested on March 16, 2007, for driving under the influence in Tampa, Florida. He was stopped by Tampa Police at 3:43 a.m. ET and booked on the misdemeanor charge. Police reports indicated that Chacín's blood alcohol level measured .150, above the legal limit of .08. The pitcher was released on a $500 bond.

See also
 List of Major League Baseball players from Venezuela

References

External links
, or Retrosheet, or Baseball America, or MILB.com

1980 births
Living people
Buffalo Bisons (minor league) players
Cardenales de Lara players
Diablos Rojos del México players
Dunedin Blue Jays players
Houston Astros players
Lehigh Valley IronPigs players
Leones del Caracas players
Long Island Ducks players
Major League Baseball pitchers
Major League Baseball players from Venezuela
Medicine Hat Blue Jays players
Mexican League baseball pitchers
Navegantes del Magallanes players
New Hampshire Fisher Cats players
New Haven Ravens players
Oklahoma City RedHawks players
Sportspeople from Maracaibo
Reading Phillies players
Rockland Boulders players
Round Rock Express players
Syracuse Chiefs players
Syracuse SkyChiefs players
Tennessee Smokies players
Tiburones de La Guaira players
Toronto Blue Jays players
Vaqueros Laguna players
Venezuelan expatriate baseball players in Canada
Venezuelan expatriate baseball players in Mexico
Venezuelan expatriate baseball players in the United States
World Baseball Classic players of Venezuela
2006 World Baseball Classic players